In fluid mechanics, the Roshko number (Ro) is a dimensionless number describing oscillating flow mechanisms. It is named after the American Professor of Aeronautics Anatol Roshko. It is defined as

where 
 St is the dimensionless Strouhal number;
 Re is the Reynolds number;
 U is mean stream velocity;
 f is the frequency of vortex shedding;
 L is the characteristic length (for example hydraulic diameter);
 ν is the kinematic viscosity of the fluid.

Correlations
Roshko determined the correlation below from experiments on the flow of air around circular cylinders over range Re=50 to Re=2000:

 valid over [ 50 <= Re <  200]
 valid over [200 <= Re < 2000]

Ormières and Provansal investigated vortex shedding in the wake of a sphere and found a relationship between Re and Ro in the range 280 < Re < 360.

Notes

References 

Dimensionless numbers of fluid mechanics
Fluid dynamics